Stadion SK Hanácká Slavia Kroměříž is a football stadium in Kroměříž, Czech Republic. It is the home ground of SK Hanácká Slavia Kroměříž. The stadium holds 1,528 people, with a seated capacity of 700.

References
 Photo gallery and data at Erlebnis-stadion.de

Football venues in the Czech Republic
Buildings and structures in Kroměříž
Sports venues completed in 1989
1989 establishments in Czechoslovakia
20th-century architecture in the Czech Republic